Mahwah may refer to the following in the U.S. state of New Jersey:

Mahwah River, a tributary of the Ramapo River
Mahwah, New Jersey, a township in Bergen County
Mahwah Township Public Schools, a school district in the above township
Mahwah High School, in the above school district
Mahwah (NJT station), a New Jersey Transit rail station